In physics and mathematics, the κ-Poincaré group, named after Henri Poincaré, is a quantum group, obtained by deformation of the Poincaré group into a Hopf algebra.

 
where  is the Minkowskian metric:

 

The commutation rules reads:
 
 

The Lorentz generator in this case is:

 

and the commutation rules reads:

 
 

The coproducts are classical, and encode the group composition law:
 
 

Also the antipodes and the counits are classical, and represent the group inversion law and the map to the identity:
 
 
 
 

The κ-Poincaré group is the dual Hopf algebra to the K-Poincaré algebra, and can be interpreted as its “finite” version.

References

Hopf algebras
Mathematical physics